Group B of the 2011 Fed Cup Americas Zone Group I was one of two pools in the Asia/Oceania zone of the 2011 Fed Cup. Four teams competed in a round robin competition, with the top team and the bottom two teams proceeding to their respective sections of the play-offs: the top teams played for advancement to the World Group II Play-offs, while the bottom teams faced potential relegation to Group II.

Colombia vs. Mexico

Brazil vs. Chile

Colombia vs. Chile

Brazil vs. Mexico

Colombia vs. Brazil

Chile vs. Mexico

See also
Fed Cup structure

References

External links
 Fed Cup website

2011 Fed Cup Americas Zone